The 1989–90 League of Ireland First Division season was the fifth season of the League of Ireland First Division.

Overview
The First Division was contested by 10 teams and Waterford United F.C. won the division.

Final table

First Division play-off
After Waterford United and Sligo Rovers finished level on points, a play-off was held to decide the overall title winners.

1st Leg

2nd Leg

Waterford United won 2–1 on aggregate and were declared champions.

See also
 1989–90 League of Ireland Premier Division

References

League of Ireland First Division seasons
2
Ireland